Alexander Ramey-Home, 10th Earl of Home (11 November 1769 – 21 October 1841), styled Lord Dunglass from 1781 to 1786, was a British politician and nobleman. He served as a representative peer for Scotland between 1807 and 1841. He gained the rank of Colonel in the service of the Berwickshire militia. He held office as the first Lord-Lieutenant of Berwickshire between 1794 and 1841.

Background
Lord Home was the son of Rev. Alexander Home, 9th Earl of Home and his third wife, Abigail Brown Ramey. He succeeded to his father's titles and estates on 8 October 1786. He was given the name of Alexander Home at birth, but on 1 March 1814 his name was legally changed to Alexander Ramey-Home by Royal Licence.

Family
Home married Lady Elizabeth Scott, daughter of Henry Scott, 3rd Duke of Buccleuch and Lady Elizabeth Montagu, daughter of George Montagu, 1st Duke of Montagu, on 6 November 1798. The couple had three sons:

 Cospatrick Alexander Home, 11th Earl of Home (born 27 October 1799, died 4 July 1881)
 Hon. William Montagu Ramey-Home (born 22 November 1800, died 22 July 1822)
 Hon. Henry Campbell Home (born 1801, died an infant)

Labrador Retrievers
In the 1830s, Lord Home, along with his nephews the 5th Duke of Buccleuch and Lord John Scott. was among the first to import Newfoundland dogs, or Labrador Retrievers as they later became known, for use as gundogs. His dogs are considered to be the progenitors of modern Labradors.

References

1769 births
1841 deaths
Earls of Home
Lord Lieutenancies of Scotland
Scottish representative peers